The Rincon Band of Luiseño Indians are a federally recognized tribe of Luiseño who live on the Rincon Indian Reservation in the Valley Center CDP, San Diego County, California. It is one of six such tribes in Southern California that are composed of Luiseño people. The Luiseño are considered one of the groups of the California Mission Indians.

The band developed the Harrah's Resort Southern California (previously known as Harrah's Rincon Resort and Casino) that is located on the reservation, as well as Rincon Reservation Road Brewery, the first tribally-owned craft brewery in Southern California. In May, 2022 the band opened the first tribal-owned tasting room outside of reservation boundaries in the San Diego neighborhood of Ocean Beach.  The tribe is a member of the Indian Health Council, which runs a health clinic on the reservation, adjacent to the casino.

Reservation
Rincon Indian Reservation lies in northeastern San Diego County, along the San Luis Rey River. The reservation was established in 1875, near the Payomkawichum village of Wáșxa.

California State Route 76 was constructed north of the reservation.

The population on the reservation is around 1,500. In the 2010 census, 188 people in the Valley Center CDP (census-designated place) self-identified as Native Americans. Tribal enrollment is about 651.

See also
 Rincon, California

Notes

References
Bean, Lowell J. and Shipek, Florence C. (1978) "Luiseño," in 'California,' vol. 8, ed. Robert Heizer, Handbook of North American Indians (Washington, D. C.: Smithsonian Institution): 550–563.

External links
 Rincon Band of Luiseño Indians tribal government homepage
 

Luiseño
California Mission Indians
Native American tribes in California
Federally recognized tribes in the United States
Native American tribes in San Diego County, California